The Gruppo Sportivo della Marina Militare is the sport section of the Italian armed force, Italian Navy.

Are part of the G.S. Marina Militare the athletes mainly of the water sports.

History
The first gold medal at the Olympic Games was won by the wrestler Enrico Porro in London 1908.

Sports
There are 9 disciplines from 5 separate competitive sports centers. Than move on to 15.

Barred the sports deleted.

Competitive sports center of swimming
 Swimming
 Open water swimming 
 Lifesaving 
 Diving
 Surf lifesaving

Competitive sports center of whitewater slalom
 Wildwater canoeing
 Canoe freestyle 

Competitive sports center of shooting
 Shooting 
 Shootgun 
 Archery 

Sports yachting center of Naples
 Sailing (Olympic)
 Sailing Mini 650 
 Offshore sailing 

Navy rowing sports centre
 Rowing
 Canoeing (sprint)
 Naval pentathlon

Notable athletes

Past athletes
Canoeing
Aldo Dezi, Olympic silver medal in 1960. First Italian canoeing Olympic medal ever.
Oreste Perri, Four-time world champion from 1974 to 1977.

Rowing
Giliante D'Este, Olympic champion in 1928 (bronze medal for Marina Militare in 1932).
Daniele Boschin, World champion (1982)
Renzo Borsini, World champion (1982)
Alfredo Striani, World champion (1988)
Enrico Barbaranelli, World champion (1988)
Franco Falossi, World champion (1990)
Roberto Romanini, World champion (1990)
Michelangelo Crispi, World champion (1992)
Franco Sancassani, Nine-time world champion from 1996 to 2011.

Sailing
Luigi De Manincor, Olympic champion in 1936.
Agostino Straulino, Olympic champion in 1952.
Nicolò Rode, Olympic champion in 1952.
Gabrio Zandonà, World champion in 2003.

Athletes qualified for London 2012
Five athletes of Marina Militare qualified for the 2012 Summer Olympics.

Gabrio Zandonà (Sailing)
Pietro Ruta (Rowing)
Michele Benedetti (Diving)
Tommaso Rinaldi (Diving)
Elania Nardelli (Shooting)
Stefano Cipressi (Canoe slalom)

Athletes qualified for Rio 2016
Nine athletes of Marina Militare qualified for the 2016 Summer Olympics.

Giovanni Abagnale (Rowing), won 
Luca Parlato (Rowing)
Antonio Barillà (Shooting)
Michele Benedetti (Diving)
Elisa Bozzo (Synchronised swimming)
Linda Cerruti (Synchronised swimming)
Beatrice Callegari (Synchronised swimming)
Costanza Ferro (Synchronised swimming)
Stefanie Horn (Canoe slalom)

Olympics gold medals
The athletes of the Marina Militare won a total of six gold medals at the Olympic Games.

See also
Italian Navy
Italian military sports bodies

References

External links
 

 
Sports organizations established in 1952
Marina Militare
Marina Militare